Panjshir (Dari: , literally "Five Lions," also spelled as Panjsher) is one of the thirty-four provinces of Afghanistan, located in the northeastern part of the country containing the Panjshir Valley. The province is divided into seven districts and contains 512 villages. As of 2021, the population of Panjshir province was about 173,000. Bazarak serves as the provincial capital.

Panjshir became an independent province from neighboring Parwan Province in 2004. It is bordered by Baghlan and Takhar in the north, Badakhshan and Nuristan in the east, Laghman and Kapisa in the south, and Parwan in the west.

History 

The territory was ruled by the Khanate of Bukhara between the early 16th century and the mid-18th century. The Parwan region, including the later Panjshir, was conquered by Ahmad Shah Durrani, and officially accepted as a part of the Durrani Empire, by Murad Beg of Bukhara, after a treaty of friendship was signed in or about 1750. The rule of the Durranis was followed by that of the Barakzai dynasty. During the 19th century, the region became part of the Emirate of Afghanistan, but was largely unaffected by British incursions, such as the  Anglo-Afghan wars. Like the rest of Afghanistan, Panjshir became part of the newly established Kingdom of Afghanistan in June 1926.

In July 1973, troops under the command of General Sardar Mohammed Daoud Khan overthrew the Afghan monarchy and established the Republic of Afghanistan. In this coup d'état, General Daoud seized power for himself, effectively proclaiming himself as the first President of Afghanistan. He began making claims over large swathes of Pashtun-dominant territory in Pakistan, causing great anxiety to the government of Pakistan. By 1975, the young Ahmad Shah Massoud and his followers initiated an uprising in Panjshir,  but were forced to flee to Peshawar in Pakistan where they received support from Pakistani Prime Minister Zulfiqar Ali Bhutto. Bhutto is said to have paved the way for the April 1978 Saur Revolution in Kabul by making General Daoud spread the Afghan Armed Forces to the countryside.

Panjshir was attacked multiple times during the 1980s Soviet–Afghan War, against Ahmad Shah Massoud and his forces. The Panjshir region was in rebel control from August 17, 1979, after a regional uprising. Aided by its mountainous terrain, the region was well defended by mujahedeen commanders during the war against the PDPA government and the Soviet Union.

After the collapse of the Democratic Republic of Afghanistan in 1992, the area became part of the Islamic State of Afghanistan. By the late 1990s, Panjshir and neighboring Badakhshan province served as a staging ground for the Northern Alliance against the Taliban. On September 9, 2001, Defense Minister Massoud was assassinated by two al-Qaeda operatives. Two days later the September 2001 attacks occurred in the United States and this led to the start of a major U.S.-led war in Afghanistan.

Containing the Panjshir Valley, in April 2004 Panjshir District of Parwan Province was turned into a province under the Karzai administration. The Afghan National Security Forces (ANSF) established several bases in the province. In the meantime, the International Security Assistance Force (ISAF) also established bases, a US-led Provincial Reconstruction Team (PRT) began operating in Panjshir in the late 2000s.

Following the Fall of Kabul on 15 August 2021, anti-Taliban forces loyal to the Islamic Republic of Afghanistan fled to the Panjshir Province. They formed the National Resistance Front of Afghanistan and kept fighting the new Islamic Emirate of Afghanistan in an ongoing conflict. The new resistance forces flew the old flag of the Northern Alliance. The resistance have held the Panjshir Valley and captured districts in neighboring provinces. By early September 2021, Taliban forces managed to push into Panjshir and capture several districts from the National Resistance Front of Afghanistan, before gaining control of Bazarak on 6 September, pushing remaining resistance fighters into the mountains. However, clashes still remain ongoing between the Taliban and resistance fighters in Panjshir Province. A subsequent visit by Radio Télévision Suisse and Journeyman Pictures into Bazarak in October 2021 also revealed that despite claims of NRF inactivity by local Taliban officials, an armed confrontation between the NRF Taliban was in fact occurring in an undisclosed location in the mountains surrounding Bazarak, with resistance forces gaining the upper hand, thus confirming that the NRF remains still active near Bazarak and in Panjshir Province. Although the NRF continues to carry out attacks, it does not control any territory in the province.

Healthcare
 
The percentage of households with clean drinking water increased from 16% in 2005, to 17% in 2011.

23% of births in 2011 were attended to by a skilled birth attendant.

Education

The overall literacy rate (6+ years of age) fell from 33% in 2005 to 32% in 2011. 
The overall net enrolment rate (6–13 years of age) fell from 42% in 2005 to 40% in 2011.
Four Technical and Vocational Education and Training (TVET) schools service the agriculturally-oriented Panjshir Province, including the Ahmad Shah Massoud TVET. The school was established with the help from the Hilfe Paderborn and German Foreign Office and as of 2014 had about 250 students and 22 staff members.

Demography

As of 2021, the total population of the province is about 173,000.

According to the Institute for the Study of War, Tajiks form the majority of the population. There is a Sunni Hazara minority in the province, who form the majority in Darah district.

Dari (Afghan Persian) is the dominant language in the province. All inhabitants are followers of Islam, and exclusively Sunni.

The proportion of residents living below the national poverty line was 19.1%.

Population by districts

Places of interest
The tomb of Ahmad Shah Massoud, is located in Saricha, Bazarak, Panjshir.
The Football Stadium in Panjshir Valley, next to the Panjshir River.
Famous Mountains of Panjshir for Hiking Includes:Panjshir Mountains
 Kuh-e Mir Samir 5 768 m (prom: 1 204 m)
 Band-e Ghār 5 387 m (prom: 465 m)
 Kōh-e Maldaygmay 5 340 m (prom: 690 m)
 Mungashayr 5 222 m (prom: 254 m)
 Kōh-e Wār 5 141 m (prom: 131 m)
 Shāhāk 5 110 m (prom: 1 471 m)
 Nāw-e Kalān 5 064 m (prom: 130 m)
 Siyāh Khār Now 5 059 m (prom: 863 m)
 Ghowch 5 012 m (prom: 129 m)
 Kōtal-e Zard 4 996 m (prom: 260 m)

Notable people
Qahar Asi, Afghan legendary poet
Muhammad Qasim Fahim, field marshal,  former Vice President of Afghanistan
Keramuddin Keram, former Governor of the province, chief executive of Afghanistan football.
Mohammad Alam Izdyar, First deputy house of elders
Abdul Hafiz Mansoor, First director of radio and television in Afghanistan
Ahmad Shah Massoud, Afghan national hero, military leader and former defense minister, known for leading armed resistances against Soviets and Taliban.
Ahmad Massoud, son of Ahmad Shah Massoud. He was appointed as the Massoud Foundation's CEO in November 2016.
Ahmad Wali Massoud, Afghan politician
Ahmad Zia Massoud, Afghan politician and former Vice President
Dastagir Panjsheri, former minister of education 
Yunus Qanuni, Afghan politician, former Vice President of Afghanistan
Amrullah Saleh, Afghan politician, former Vice President of Afghanistan 
Haidari Wujodi, Afghan Sufi poet and scholar
Amrullah Saleh, Afghan politician
Hasib Quwai Markaz, powerful military leader of National Resistance Front of Afghanistan
Bismillah Khan Mohammadi, Afghan politician and former defense minister

See also
Provinces of Afghanistan
Panjshir Valley
Panjshir River

References

External links 

Panjshir Province by the Naval Postgraduate School
Panjshir Province by the Institute for the Study of War
Panjshir Province Archives by Clarksville Online

Panjshir Province
States and territories established in 2004
2004 establishments in Afghanistan
Provinces of the Islamic Republic of Afghanistan